Onofrio Fusco (23 November 1918 in Bari – 4 November 1994 in Bari) was an Italian professional football player and coach.

He played for 8 seasons (143 games, 3 goals) in the Serie A for A.S. Bari, A.S. Roma and Atalanta B.C.

External links

1918 births
1994 deaths
Footballers from Bari
Italian footballers
Serie A players
Serie B players
S.S.C. Bari players
A.S. Roma players
Atalanta B.C. players
U.S. Avellino 1912 players
Italian football managers
S.S.C. Bari managers
Association football midfielders